Ajil-e Moshkel-gosha, literally problem-solving nuts, is a mix of diverse dried nuts and fruits that is served during Yalda in Iran. It is popularly believed that by making a wish and eating it, a problem will be resolved.

References

Spring traditions
Iranian folklore
Persian words and phrases
Iranian cuisine